William Windham may refer to:

William Windham (of Earsham, senior) (died 1730), Member of Parliament 1722–1730
William Windham (of Earsham, junior) (c. 1706–1789), son of the above, Member of Parliament 1766–1768
William Windham (rower) (1926–2021), Olympic rower
William Windham Sr. (1717–1761), of Felbrigg, traveler and militia advocate
William Windham (1750–1810), of Felbrigg, son of the above, Whig statesman
William Lukin Windham (1768–1833), Royal Navy officer
William Windham (Liberal politician) (1802–1854), son of the above, Member of Parliament 1832–1835
William Frederick Windham (1840–1866), heir to Felbrigg Hall in Norfolk

See also
William Wyndham (disambiguation)
William Windom (1827–1891), American politician
William Windom (actor) (1923–2012), American actor, great-grandson of the above